Loh Sze Yee is a Malaysian politician who has served as Member of the Perak State Executive Council (EXCO) in the Barisan Nasional (BN) state administration under Menteri Besar Saarani Mohamad since November 2022 and Member of the Perak State Legislative Assembly (MLA) for Jalong since May 2013. He is a member of the Democratic Action Party (DAP), a component party of the Pakatan Harapan (PH) coalition.

Personal life 
His hobbies are swimming and jogging. He studied in SMK Anderson and is a Bachelor of Business Administration from Nottingham Trent University.

Early career 
He is also a businessman and Lecturer of Olympia College.

Political career 
He is the Member of Committee since 2013 and the Director of Political Education of DAP Perak. He is one of the member of Perak State Agricultural Development Corporation Board (PPPNP) from 2018 to 2019. He was elected to the Perak State Legislative Assembly for the seat of Jalong. He was reelected as the Jalong MLA in the 2018 and 2022 Perak state elections. On 22 November 2022, he was appointed as the Perak EXCO in charge of tourism, industry, investment and corridor development.

Election results

Notes

References 

Democratic Action Party (Malaysia) politicians
Members of the Perak State Legislative Assembly
Malaysian people of Chinese descent
Living people
1975 births